Novotel London Canary Wharf also known as 40 Marsh Wall is a 127 m (419 ft), 39-storey hotel in the Isle of Dogs, London, just south of the financial district of Canary Wharf. It has been designed by BUJ Architects for AccorHotels as one of the company's Novotel hotels and has 313 rooms. It is the tallest all-hotel building in the United Kingdom and the tallest Novotel in the world.

Construction began in July 2014, costing an estimated £60 million.

Planning permission was granted for the hotel in November 2010 by Tower Hamlets Council. It replaces an office building of six-storeys and 43,768 sq ft which was formerly on the site.

See also 
Hotels in London
List of tallest buildings and structures in London
List of tallest buildings and structures in the United Kingdom

References 

Canary Wharf buildings
Skyscrapers in the London Borough of Tower Hamlets
Canary Wharf
Skyscraper hotels in London
Hotel buildings completed in 2016
Novotel